The French submarine Sané was one of two s built for the French Navy during World War I.

See also 
List of submarines of France

Notes

Bibliography

External links
Castel, Marc: Dupuy de Lôme at Sous-marins Français 1863 - pagesperso-orange.fr (French)

Dupuy de Lôme-class submarines
Ships built in France
1916 ships